Ioan Bogdan (born 26 January 1956) is a Romanian former footballer who played as a defender.

International career
Ioan Bogdan played nine matches for Romania's national team, including a 3–1 victory against Cyprus at the Euro 1984 qualifiers.

Honours
Corvinul Hunedoara
Divizia B: 1979–80

References

1956 births
Living people
Romanian footballers
Romania international footballers
Association football defenders
Liga I players
Liga II players
FC UTA Arad players
CS Corvinul Hunedoara players
Sportspeople from Arad, Romania